Tin Can Trust is a 2010 album by the band Los Lobos, and is the band's first collection of new original material since 2006. It features rock 'n' roll, blues, two Spanish language tracks, and a Grateful Dead cover song. The album was nominated for a Grammy Award for Best Americana Album.

Track listing

Personnel 
Instrumentation for Los Lobos is unspecified on the album, but this is the usual:
 David Hidalgo – vocals, guitar, accordion, fiddle, requinto jarocho
 Louie Pérez – vocals, guitar, drums, jarana
 Cesar Rosas – vocals, guitar, bajo sexto
 Conrad Lozano – vocals, bass, guitarron
 Steve Berlin – keyboards, woodwinds

Additional musicians

Credits adapted from the album's liner notes.
 Cougar Estrada – drums, percussion 
 Susan Tedeschi – backing vocals (1)
 Rev. Charles Williams – keyboards (3, 7)

Technical
Los Lobos – producer
Shane Smith – engineer, mixing (3, 7)
John Macy – engineer
Dave Simon-Baker – engineer
Jeff Ward – engineer
Steve Weeder – engineer
David Kalish – assistant engineer
Nick Sullivan – assistant engineer
Dave McNair – mixing (except 3, 7), mastering
Cesar Rosas – mixing (3, 7)
Louie Perez – art direction, photography
Al Quattrocchi – art direction, photography 
Jeff Smith – art direction
Tornado Design – design
Drew Reynolds – photography
Derek Dressler – A&R
Robert Kim – project assistant
Dave McIntosh – music business affairs

References

2010 albums
Los Lobos albums